Geoff Grant (2 December 1914 – 8 May 1973) was  a former Australian rules footballer who played with Richmond in the Victorian Football League (VFL).

Notes

External links 
		

1914 births
1973 deaths
Australian rules footballers from Victoria (Australia)
Richmond Football Club players